Baron Félix de Blochausen (5 March 1834 – 15 November 1915), was a Luxembourgish politician.  An Orangist, he was the sixth Prime Minister of Luxembourg, serving for ten years, from 26 December 1874 until 20 February 1885.

Minister for the Interior 
From 14 December 1866 to 3 December 1867 he was Director-General (Minister) for the Interior in the government of Victor de Tornaco. From 1872 to 1873 he was President of the Chamber of Deputies.

Prime minister 
On 26 December 1874, after Emmanuel Servais' resignation, de Blochausen was appointed prime minister and Director-General for Foreign Affairs. From 21 September to 12 October 1882, he was Director-General of Finances. Under his government, the criminal code and education were reformed. On 20 February 1885 de Blochausen had to resign due to an insider trading scandal.

Domestic policy 
The Blochausen government introduced reforms of primary education. Against the opposition of conservative Deputies, it made it obligatory for children to attend school for six years, from ages 6 to 12. The reform gave rise to far-reaching debates over the role of the state in society, and the relationship between church and state. The new law made it the state's duty to organise public education, whereas the church retained a level of influence over education on the local level, and had powers of supervision over teachers.

Post-government career 
From 1893 until his death, Félix de Blochausen was the president of the Société agricole grand-ducale. He died on 15 November 1915 at his birthplace, Schloss Birtrange.

See also

Blochausen Ministry

References 

|-

|-

Prime Ministers of Luxembourg
Ministers for Foreign Affairs of Luxembourg
Ministers for Finances of Luxembourg
Presidents of the Chamber of Deputies (Luxembourg)
Luxembourgian Orangists
Barons of Luxembourg
Luxembourgian nobility
1834 births
1915 deaths
Alumni of the Athénée de Luxembourg
19th-century Luxembourgian people